The 2014 Copa de la Reina de Balonmano was the 35th edition of the Copa de la Reina de Balonmano. It took place in Alcobendas, city of the Community of Madrid, from 14 to 16 March. The matches were played at Pabellón Amaya Valdemoro, with 1,894 capacity seating. It was hosted by Federación Madrileña de Balonmano, Comunidad de Madrid, Alcobendas municipality & RFEBM. Alcobendas hosted Copa de la Reina for first time.

BM Bera Bera won its fourth title after defeating Ro'Casa ACE G.C. in the Final, being the second title in a row.

Qualified teams
The qualified teams were the top eight teams on standings at midseason.

Venue

Matches

Quarter-finals

Semifinals

Final

Top goalscorers

Source: own compilation

See also
2013–14 División de Honor Femenina de Balonmano

References

External links
Official website
Official guide

2014
Copa